Hesperocyparis (western cypress) is a genus of trees in the family Cupressaceae, containing North American species otherwise assigned to the genus Cupressus. They are found throughout western North America. Only a few species have wide ranges, with most being restricted-range endemics.

Members of Hesperocyparis were and still are placed in Cupressus by many authorities, but phylogenetic evidence supports a different affinity. A 2021 molecular study found Hesperocyparis to be the sister group to the genus Callitropsis (containing only the Nootka cypress), with this clade being sister to the Asian genus Xanthocyparis, containing only the Vietnamese golden cypress. The clade comprising all three genera was found to be sister to a clade containing Juniperus and Cupressus sensu stricto.

This genus contains the following species:
Hesperocyparis abramsiana (C. B. Wolf) Bartel
Hesperocyparis arizonica (Greene) Bartel
Hesperocyparis bakeri (Jeps.) Bartel
Hesperocyparis benthamii (Endl.) Bartel
Hesperocyparis forbesii (Jeps.) Bartel
Hesperocyparis glabra (Sudw.) Bartel
Hesperocyparis goveniana (Gordon) Bartel
Hesperocyparis guadalupensis (S. Watson) Bartel
Hesperocyparis lusitanica (Mill.) Bartel
Hesperocyparis macnabiana (A. Murray bis) Bartel
Hesperocyparis macrocarpa (Hartw.) Bartel
Hesperocyparis montana (Wiggins) Bartel
Hesperocyparis nevadensis (Abrams) Bartel
Hesperocyparis pigmaea (Lemmon) Bartel
Hesperocyparis sargentii (Jeps.) Bartel
Hesperocyparis stephensonii (Jeps.) Bartel

References

 
Conifer genera